Constructed about 1810, in the Federal style, for George Chisolm (1772-1835), a factor, the two-and-one-half story George Chisolm House is the first house to have been built upon the landfill project that formed Charleston, South Carolina's Battery. The garden to the south of the house was designed by Loutrel Briggs, and later modified by Sheila Wertimer. The address is 39 East Bay Street; it formerly was 39 East Battery Street.

In 1877, the house was bought by Edwin P. Frost. Frost served as a vestryman at St. Michael's Episcopal Church where he was responsible for hiring Tiffany & Co. to decorate its chancel. At the same time, he had the company decorate the living room of 39 East Battery with gold leaf. The decoration was removed in 1970.

Beginning circa 1975, Lorna Colbert and her son Stephen Colbert occupied the house while she ran the carriage house as a bed and breakfast.

See also 
West Point Rice Mill

References

External links 

Historic American Buildings Survey in South Carolina
Houses in Charleston, South Carolina